Clinidium incis is a species of ground beetle in the subfamily Rhysodinae. It was described by R.T. Bell in 1970. It is endemic to Puerto Rico. The specific name is derived from the Latin incus and refers to the type locality, El Yunque, which is the Spanish word for anvil. Grammatically, the spelling should have been incudis ("of the anvil").

Clinidium incis measure  in length.

References

Clinidium
Beetles of the United States
Insects of Puerto Rico
Endemic fauna of Puerto Rico
Beetles described in 1970